Akseli Takala (23 May 1897 – 18 March 1951) was a Finnish athlete. He competed in the men's shot put at the 1924 Summer Olympics.

References

External links
 

1897 births
1951 deaths
Athletes (track and field) at the 1924 Summer Olympics
Finnish male shot putters
Olympic athletes of Finland